

Leaf peeping is an informal term in the United States and Canada for the activity in which people travel to view and photograph the fall foliage in areas where leaves change colors in autumn,
particularly in northern New England, Appalachia, the Pacific Northwest, and the upper Midwest, as well as the provinces of Ontario and Quebec.
An organized excursion for leaf peeping is known as a foliage tour or color tour.

A similar custom in Japan is called .

United States

The term "leaf peeper" is used both with appreciation from businesses that benefit from the millions that pour into the higher elevations of the West, upper Midwest, and northern New England in fall, and with disdain from those who have to use the roads that get over-crowded due to leaf peepers.  Hobbyists who get together for leaf peeping may refer to their gatherings as leaf peepshows.

In popular culture
The term "leaf peeping" has been used in numerous television shows, including "And It's Surely to Their Credit," an episode of The West Wing, and "Live Free or Die," an episode of The Sopranos.

Japan

, from the Japanese  'red leaves' or 'maple tree' and  'hunting', is the Japanese tradition of going to visit scenic areas where leaves have turned red in the autumn. It is also called  in Hokkaidō, which means "getting together to view the leaves".

See also
 Hanami

References

Autumn
Japanese culture
Leaves
Observation hobbies
Tourism in Japan
Tourism in the United States